Acentrogobius therezieni is a species of goby endemic to hard, fresh waters of Madagascar.  This species can reach a length of  TL.

References

Acentrogobius
Freshwater fish of Madagascar
Fish described in 1963
Taxonomy articles created by Polbot